Michael Zachries (29 October 1943 – 28 July 2021) was a German sailor. He won a bronze medal in the Soling Class with Dieter Below and Olaf Engelhardt at the 1976 Summer Olympics in Montreal, Quebec, Canada.

References

1943 births
2021 deaths
People from Zwickau
German male sailors (sport)
Olympic sailors of East Germany
Olympic bronze medalists for East Germany
Olympic medalists in sailing
Sailors at the 1976 Summer Olympics – Soling
Sailors at the 1980 Summer Olympics – Soling
Medalists at the 1976 Summer Olympics
European Champions Soling
Sportspeople from Saxony